Hicran Muazzez Abacı (born November 12, 1947) is a Turkish singer. Trained in Turkish classical music, she has achieved considerable popular success in the Turkish Classical Music genre. She has been active since 1973 with a silent period between 2002 and 2012.

Awards 
 State Artist (awarded in 1998)

Discography

Studio albums 
 Muazzez Abacı Söylüyor (1975)
 Ölümsüz Eserlerle Muazzez Abacı (1975)
 Dönüş  (1978)
 Yasemen (1981)
 Muazzez Abacı Söylüyor ( 1982)
 Sevdiklerinizle Muazzez Abacı 83 (1983)
 Geceler ( 1986)
 Şakayık (1986)
 Söyleme Bilmesinler (1987)
 Felek (1989)
 Vurgun (1990)   
 Sensiz Olmadı (1991)
 Efendim (1992)
 Kar Yangınları (1994)
 Güller Arasında (1994)
 Tutkunum (1995)
 Cesaretim Var (1998)
 Muazzez Abacı & Zeki Müren Düet (1998)
 Hükümlüyüm ( 2001)
 Bir Efsanedir (2013)
 Ajda Pekkan & Muazzez Abacı (2014)

See also 
 Turkish music

Notes

External links 
 Sunday's Zaman - Celebrities and the mob
  Milliyet Newspaper - Emel Sayın and Muazzez Abacı

1947 births
Musicians from Ankara
Turkish classical singers
Turkish women singers
Living people
State Artists of Turkey
TED Ankara College Foundation Schools alumni